Terence Patrick Brennan (June 11, 1928 – September 7, 2021) was an American college football player and coach. He served as the head football coach at the University of Notre Dame from 1954 to 1958, compiling a record of 32–18.

Early life and playing career
A native of the Village of Whitefish Bay, Wisconsin, a suburb of Milwaukee, Wisconsin, Terry Brennan was a standout multi-sport athlete at Marquette University High School. He went on to play halfback at the University of Notre Dame from 1945 to 1948, graduating in 1949.

In 1951, he married Mary Louise "Kel" Kelley. His wife died in 2001, following fifty years of marriage.

Coaching career
After graduating from Notre Dame, Brennan coached at Mount Carmel High School in Chicago and won three successive city championships. Brennan returned to Notre Dame in 1953 as freshman football coach and succeeded Frank Leahy as head coach the following year.

In 1954, Notre Dame had a 9–1 record, with players recruited by Leahy. In 1955, the Irish were 8–2. In 1956, Brennan had mostly sophomore starters, due to numerous injuries; the result was a 2–8 record, and the first losing season for Notre Dame since 1933 and the worst in school history. However, running back Paul Hornung won the Heisman Trophy that year.

Brennan's 1957 squad earned the nickname, "Comeback Comets" after finishing 7–3. Among their victories was a 23–21 comeback over Army and a 7–0 shutout of Oklahoma, snapping the Sooners' NCAA record 47-game winning streak.

After a 6–4 record in 1958, the movement to dismiss Brennan gained momentum, and the coach was fired along with his entire staff in mid-December; Hugh Devore was eventually retained. Notre Dame's administration was heavily criticized for the firing, considering Brennan's overall 32–18 record against the caliber of their opponents. He was succeeded as Notre Dame's head coach by Joe Kuharich.

Later life and honors
Brennan served as player conditioning coach for baseball's Cincinnati Reds during spring training in 1959 and eventually joined a Chicago investment banking firm.

Brennan is a member of the Chicagoland Sports Hall of Fame and was elected to the Wisconsin Athletic Hall of Fame in 1981.

He was the author of the book Though The Odds be Great or Small, about the 1957 Notre Dame football season, which was published in 2021.

Death
He died on September 7, 2021, at the age of 93. He is survived by his wife, six children, 25 grandchildren, and 32 great-grandchildren.

Head coaching record

College

References

1928 births
2021 deaths
American football halfbacks
College football announcers
Notre Dame Fighting Irish football coaches
Notre Dame Fighting Irish football players
High school football coaches in Illinois
Sportspeople from Milwaukee
Players of American football from Milwaukee
Marquette University High School alumni